Plotnikova may refer to:

Geography

 Plotnikova, Perm Krai, village in Kudymkarsky District, Perm Krai, Russia
 Plotnikova (river), river in the western Kamchatka Peninsula, Russia

People

 Irina Plotnikova, Russian pianist
 Jana Plotnikova, Lithuanian female acrobatics gymnast
 Klavdiya Plotnikova (c. 1893–1989),  last living speaker of the Kamassian language
 Yelena Plotnikova, (born 1978), Russian volleyball player